The French Artistic Mission in Brazil was a group of French artists and architects that came to Rio de Janeiro, then the capital city of the United Kingdom of Portugal, Brazil and the Algarves, in March 1816, under the auspices of the royal court of Portugal, which had been transferred to Brazil since 1808 due to Portugal's invasion by Napoleon Bonaparte. The Mission, led by Joachim Lebreton, had the mission of establishing the Escola Real de Ciências, Artes e Ofícios (Royal School of Sciences, Arts and Crafts), which later became the Escola Nacional de Belas Artes (National School of Fine Arts).

The Mission was formed by the following artists:
 Jean-Baptiste Debret, painter
 Nicolas Antoine Taunay, painter
 Auguste Marie Taunay, sculptor
 Marc Ferrez, sculptor
 Zéphirin Ferrez, sculptor
 Charles-Simon Pradier
 Grandjean de Montigny, architect

In the 20th century, the French Artistic Mission had continued in São Paulo to the foundation of the University of São Paulo, with the support of the anthropologist Claude Lévi-Strauss, in 1934.

References

Historiography of Brazil
Brazilian art
1816 in Brazil
1934 in Brazil